

Crown
Head of State – Queen Elizabeth II

Federal government
Governor General – Roméo LeBlanc

Cabinet
Prime Minister –  Jean Chrétien
Deputy Prime Minister – Sheila Copps
Minister of Finance – Paul Martin
Minister of Foreign Affairs – André Ouellet then Lloyd Axworthy
Minister of National Defence – David Collenette then Doug Young
Minister of Health – Diane Marleau then David Dingwall
Minister of Industry – John Manley
Minister of Heritage – Sheila Copps (position was only created on July 12 of 1996)
Minister of Intergovernmental Affairs – Marcel Massé then Stéphane Dion
Minister of the Environment – Sheila Copps then Sergio Marchi
Minister of Justice – Allan Rock
Minister of Transport – Doug Young then David Anderson
Minister of Communications – Michel Dupuy then Sheila Copps (position merged into that of Heritage Minister on July 11, 1996)
Minister of Citizenship and Immigration – Sergio Marchi then Lucienne Robillard
Minister of Fisheries and Oceans – Brian Tobin then Fred Mifflin
Minister of Agriculture – Ralph Goodale
Minister of Public Works and Government Services – Diane Marleau (position created on July 12.)
Minister of Employment and Immigration – Lloyd Axworthy then Doug Young then Pierre Pettigrew (position was renamed Minister of Human Resources Development on July 11)
Minister of Natural Resources – Anne McLellan
Minister of Public Works – David Dingwall then Diane Marleau (position discontinued on July 11)
Minister of Supply and Services – David Dingwall then Diane Marleau (position discontinued on July 11)

Members of Parliament
See: 35th Canadian parliament

Party leaders
Liberal Party of Canada –  Jean Chrétien
Bloc Québécois – Lucien Bouchard  then Gilles Duceppe (interim) then Michel Gauthier
New Democratic Party- Alexa McDonough
Progressive Conservative Party of Canada – Jean Charest
Reform Party of Canada – Preston Manning

Supreme Court Justices
Chief Justice: Antonio Lamer
Beverley McLachlin
Frank Iacobucci
John C. Major
Gérard V. La Forest
John Sopinka
Peter deCarteret Cory
Claire L'Heureux-Dubé
Charles D. Gonthier

Other
Speaker of the House of Commons – Gilbert Parent
Governor of the Bank of Canada – Gordon Thiessen
Chief of the Defence Staff – General Jean Boyle then Vice-Admiral Larry Murray

Provinces

Premiers
Premier of Alberta – Ralph Klein
Premier of British Columbia – Mike Harcourt then Glen Clark
Premier of Manitoba – Gary Filmon
Premier of New Brunswick – Frank McKenna
Premier of Newfoundland – Clyde Wells then Brian Tobin
Premier of Nova Scotia – John Savage
Premier of Ontario – Mike Harris
Premier of Prince Edward Island – Catherine Callbeck then Keith Milligan then Pat Binns
Premier of Quebec – Jacques Parizeau then Lucien Bouchard
Premier of Saskatchewan – Roy Romanow
Premier of the Northwest Territories – Don Morin
Premier of Yukon – John Ostashek then Piers McDonald

Lieutenant-governors
Lieutenant-Governor of Alberta – Gordon Towers then Bud Olson
Lieutenant-Governor of British Columbia – Garde Gardom
Lieutenant-Governor of Manitoba – Yvon Dumont
Lieutenant-Governor of New Brunswick – Margaret Norrie McCain
Lieutenant-Governor of Newfoundland and Labrador – Frederick Russell
Lieutenant-Governor of Nova Scotia – James Kinley
Lieutenant-Governor of Ontario – Hal Jackman
Lieutenant-Governor of Prince Edward Island – Gilbert Clements
Lieutenant-Governor of Quebec – Martial Asselin then Jean-Louis Roux
Lieutenant-Governor of Saskatchewan – Jack Wiebe

Mayors
Toronto – Barbara Hall
Montreal – Pierre Bourque
Vancouver – Philip Owen
Ottawa – Jacquelin Holzman

Religious leaders
Roman Catholic Bishop of Quebec –  Archbishop Maurice Couture
Roman Catholic Bishop of Montreal –  Cardinal Archbishop Jean-Claude Turcotte
Roman Catholic Bishops of London – Bishop John Michael Sherlock
Moderator of the United Church of Canada – Marion Best

See also
1995 Canadian incumbents
Events in Canada in 1996
1997 Canadian incumbents
Governmental leaders in 1996
Canadian incumbents by year

1996
Incumbents
1996 in Canadian politics
Canadian leaders